Grace Bakari (born 27 April 1954) is a Ghanaian sprinter. She competed in the women's 4 × 400 metres relay at the 1984 Summer Olympics.

References

External links
 

1954 births
Living people
Athletes (track and field) at the 1984 Summer Olympics
Ghanaian female sprinters
Ghanaian female middle-distance runners
Olympic athletes of Ghana
Place of birth missing (living people)
African Games medalists in athletics (track and field)
African Games silver medalists for Ghana
Athletes (track and field) at the 1973 All-Africa Games
Athletes (track and field) at the 1978 All-Africa Games
Olympic female sprinters